The McLaren M16 was a race car designed and built by McLaren between 1971 and 1976 for American open wheel racing. It is the most successful car of the 1970s at the Indianapolis 500 with three wins in 1972, 1974 and 1976 and the last one to win with the Offenhauser engine.

History

1971 
The car was unveiled in January 1971 to replace the M15. Initially named simply M16, the 1971 version is known retrospectively as M16A due to the successive updates. The chassis is an aluminium monocoque powered by the omnipresent at the time Offenhauser straight-4 engine, which in its 159 c.i. (2.61l) version and equipped with a Garrett turbocharger limited to 24.6 psi (1.7 bar) delivered over 700 hp. Following a trend set by the previous year Lotus 72, the radiators were moved to the sidepods giving the car a wedge shape.
Two cars driven by Denny Hulme and Peter Revson entered the Indianapolis 500 under the McLaren team and one more car run by Penske and driven by Mark Donohue. The three cars made the qualified in the top 4, but only Revson manages to finish the race in second place.

1972 
The new car was baptised as M16B. For that year Indy 500 Gordon Johncock replaced Denny Hulme and Penske entered a second car for Gary Bettenhausen. Although none of those three crossed the finish line, Mark Donohue did so in the first place, making the car the first McLaren to win the famous race and also giving Penske their first of a long list of victories at Indy.

1973 
The M16C saw Johnny Rutherford joining the official team.

1974 
Johnny Rutherford took the M16C/D to victory lane.

1975 
This year McLaren fielded two new M16E cars while Penske preferred to stick to the previous year cars. Johnny Rutherford finished second both at Indy and the championship overall.

1976 
Johnny Rutherford won his second Indy 500 with the M16E.
This was the last year of the M16 as a factory entered car, as Mclaren introduced its replacement, the M24. However, several M16s continued racing by other teams until 1981.

References

External links
https://www.mclaren.com/racing/2017/indy-500/mclaren-m16-three-time-indy-500-winner-2134343

Indianapolis 500
American Championship racing cars